Ronald Harvey Spector (born January 17, 1943) is a military historian who contributes to scholarly journals and teaches history as a professor at George Washington University.

Military career 
He enlisted in the United States Marine Corps and served in the Vietnam War, reaching the rank of Lieutenant Colonel in the reserves.  He was a historian at the U.S. Army Center of Military history and taught at the University of Alabama. He was tasked to prepare a study of the Grenada operation.

Education 
He graduated from Johns Hopkins University, and later gained a Ph.D from Yale University.

Academic career

Spector was a Senior Fulbright scholar in India from 1977 to 1978.  He has taught at the National War College, the University of Alabama, and the U.S. Army War College.  He currently is serving on the faculty of The George Washington University in Washington, DC.

Publications 

 A Continent Erupts: Decolonization, Civil War, and Massacre in Postwar Asia, 1945-1955. New York, W. W. Norton & Company, 2022.
 In the Ruins of Empire: The Japanese Surrender and the Battle for Postwar Asia.  New York: Random House, 2007.
 At War at Sea: Sailors and Naval Warfare in the Twentieth Century.  New York: Viking Press, 2001.
 The Oxford Companion to American Military History.  New York: Oxford University Press: 1999. Co-edited with Fred Anderson, John W. Chambers, Lynn Eden and Joseph Glatthaar.
 After Tet: The Bloodiest Year in Vietnam. New York: Free Press, 1993.
 Eagle Against the Sun: The American War with Japan.  New York: Free Press and Macmillan, 1984.
 Advice and Support: The Early Years, 1941-1960 - The U.S. Army in Vietnam, Volume 1 (1983)
 Professors of War: The Naval College and the Development of the Naval Profession (1977)
 Admiral of the New Empire: The Life and Career of George Dewey (1974, second edition 1988)

Awards
Spector was awarded the Samuel Eliot Morison Prize, for his breadth of contributions to the field of military history. His book Eagle Against the Sun: The American War with Japan was the 1986 winner of the Theodore and Franklin D. Roosevelt Prize in Naval History.

References

External links

Living people
21st-century American historians
21st-century American male writers
United States Marine Corps officers
United States Marine Corps personnel of the Vietnam War
University of Alabama faculty
George Washington University faculty
Yale University alumni
Johns Hopkins University alumni
United States Marine Corps reservists
1943 births
American male non-fiction writers